Kreher Preserve and Nature Center (KPNC), previously known as the Louise Kreher Forest Ecology Preserve, is a  nature preserve located between Auburn and Opelika in Lee County, Alabama. Established in 1993 through a gift, it is operated as a non-profit outreach program of Auburn University's School of Forestry & Wildlife Sciences. The nature center includes a nature playground, amphitheater, wheel-chair accessible 150-seat multi-level meeting area and fire pit, and a covered educational pavilion. There are interpretive signs along the 30 trails that cover 6 miles, restrooms, and drinking fountains.

The KPNC offers environmental education and outreach programs including animal encounters and guided walks, day camps and pre-school programs.

The KPNC was established by Dr. Louise Kreher Turner (1914-2012) and her husband Frank Allen Turner, who donated and endowed the property to Auburn University for conservation and educational purposes.

References

External links
Kreher Preserve and Nature Center

Auburn, Alabama
Protected areas of Lee County, Alabama
Nature reserves in Alabama
Nature centers in Alabama
Auburn University